Cryptandra pungens is a species of flowering plant in the family Rhamnaceae and is endemic to the southwest of Western Australia. Flowering occurs from May to November. The species was first formally described in 1845 by Ernst Gottlieb von Steudel in Lehmann's Plantae Preissianae from specimens collected in sandy forest near Perth. The specific epithet (pungens) means "ending in a sharp, hard point".

Cryptandra pungens grows on coastal limestone, granite outcrops, sandplains and hills in the Avon Wheatbelt, Coolgardie, Esperance Plains, Geraldton Sandplains, Jarrah Forest, Mallee and Swan Coastal Plain  bioregions of south-western Western Australia. It is listed as "not threatened" by the Western Australian Government Department of Biodiversity, Conservation and Attractions.

References

pungens
Rosales of Australia
Flora of Western Australia
Plants described in 1845
Taxa named by Ernst Gottlieb von Steudel